Fortia may refer to:
 Fortià, a municipality in Catalonia, Spain
 ForTIA, a non-governmental organisation aiming to support the industrial use of formal methods
 Fortia (film) and Fortia SP, brands of color reversal film by Fujifilm 
 Château Fortia, a French wine-producing estate in Châteauneuf-du-Pape
 Albert Jorquera i Fortià (born 1979), Spanish retired football goalkeeper
 Suleiman Fortia, a member of the Libyan National Transitional Council